Padria is a comune (municipality) in the Province of Sassari on the Italian island of Sardinia, located about  northwest of Cagliari and about  south of Sassari.

Padria borders the following municipalities: Bosa, Cossoine, Mara, Monteleone Rocca Doria, Pozzomaggiore, Romana, Villanova Monteleone.

Demographic evolution

References

Cities and towns in Sardinia
Roman towns and cities in Italy